Joe Kernan or Joseph Kernan may refer to:

 Joe Kernan (baseball), 19th-century American baseball player
 Joe Kernan (Gaelic footballer) (born 1954)
 Joe Kernan (politician) (1946–2020), American politician
 Joseph D. Kernan (born 1955), United States Navy admiral

See also 
 Joe Kernen (born 1956), American news anchor on CNBC